Anastasia P. Williams (born 1957) is an American politician who is a Democratic party member of the Rhode Island House of Representatives, representing the 9th District since 1993. During the 2009–2010 sessions, she served on the House Committee on Municipal Government, and the Joint Committee on Accounts and Claims. She also served as the Chairperson of the House Committee on Labor.

References

External links
Rhode Island House – Representative Anastasia Williams official RI House website

1957 births
Living people
People from Colón, Panama
21st-century American politicians
American politicians of Panamanian descent
Democratic Party members of the Rhode Island House of Representatives
Politicians from Providence, Rhode Island
Panamanian emigrants to the United States